Kao Pao-shu or Gao Baoshu (1932–2000) was a Chinese actress, producer, writer and film director who appeared in over 100 films during her career. Originally from China, Kao moved to Hong Kong in 1951, where she acted in minor roles before joining Shaw Brothers Studio in 1958. Here, she starred in over 80 films, working alongside directors Yueh Feng and Cheng Kang, and she made her directorial debut in 1970 in Lady with a Sword. Later she started her own company, producing films throughout the 1970s before she retired in the 1980s. In July 2000, she died at the age of 68.

Biography
Kao was born in Jiangsu, China, and left school at the age of 13 to find work following the death of her father. She worked as a reporter in Anhui and joined a drama troupe where she met actor Chiang Nan, whom she later married. In 1951, Kao moved to Hong Kong and worked with a number of production companies including Hsin Hwa Motion Picture Company, where she appeared in Hong Kong's first Eastman Color film Blood Will Tell (1955). Kao joined Shaw Brothers Studio in 1958, where she appeared in over 80 films and directed her first film, Lady With a Sword (1970).

By 1971, Kao had left the Shaw Brothers and started up her own production company alongside her second husband, Vengee Park. The new company, Park Films, produced 11 films, with Kao directing 10 and acting as writer for six. After finishing her last film in 1980, Kao left the industry and died in 2000.

Filmography

Films 
This is a partial list of films.

References

External links
 

Chinese women film directors
1932 births
2000 deaths
20th-century Chinese actresses
Chinese women screenwriters
Actresses from Jiangsu
Film directors from Jiangsu
Screenwriters from Jiangsu
20th-century screenwriters